Barry Ono (1876–1941) was a British variety theatre performer, collector of penny dreadfuls and benefactor of the British Library. His collection of songbooks was bequeathed to the British Library in 1941.

Life
Barry Ono was the stage name of Frederick Valentine Harrison.  Ono was born in Chelsea, London on 21 May 1876. Though he struggled early in his career as a comedian and comedic songwriter, he did gain some notoriety and experienced a peak in his career in 1929.  Several of his songs were published in collections such as The Great Barry Ono Song Book. He was especially known for a one-man routine called "The Old Time Music Hall."  In this 12-minute routine, Ono would do impressions of former singers performing their favorite songs. Ono began withdrawing from the stage in 1930 and it has been speculated that this was connected to the death of Maude Walsh, who shared the stage with him in 1927. In 1932, Ono married Dorinda Hill (the stage name of Dorothy Hiscox) and, though their wedding certificate records that Ono was a widower, no records of any previous marriages have been found.

Notes

Sources

1876 births
1941 deaths